Pristimantis cruentus is a species of frog in the family Strabomantidae, sometimes known as the Chiriqui robber frog. It is found in Costa Rica, Panama, and north-western Colombia.
Its natural habitats are forests, including humid lowland and montane forests. It can also be found in degraded habitats outside forests. It is threatened by habitat loss.

References

cruentus
Amphibians of Colombia
Amphibians of Costa Rica
Amphibians of Panama
Amphibians described in 1873
Taxa named by Wilhelm Peters
Taxonomy articles created by Polbot